A , is a legendary creature said to have inhabited river systems in what is now Hubei Province in China.

The water tiger is described as similar (in size) to a 3 or 4-year old human child, with tiger-like attributes in the lower limb and perhaps the head, though interpretations have varied. The modern interpretation is that the tiger-like (head), claws, etc., are always submerged and hidden, but the kneecap is exposed to view, although if a human tries to tamper with he may be killed.

Japanese books during the Tokugawa Period read the Chinese text rather differently. Wakan Sansai Zue, an influential encyclopedia of the early 18th-century, gave a considerably divergent reading and stated  that the suiko possessed kneecaps like tiger-claws. This odd feature was replicated in its woodcut illustration, and propagated in Toriyama Sekien's drawing of the suiko in his yōkai anthology.

Past Japanese writers also sometimes used "suiko (water-tiger)" as a stilted  term for the kappa (aka kawatarō) in native folklore, even though Wakan Sansai Zue had distinguished these as two separate beings.

General description 

The shuihu or shui hu ("water tiger") is described as being "about the size of a three- or four-year old (human) child", with a head like a tiger's, and a shell like that of the pangolin. Their knees, which are also tiger-like may be visible above water, but their claws always remain submerged, despite their habit of lying on sand and basking in the sun in autumn.

Alternative reading 
A dissident reading exists, particularly among Japanese sources. The Osaka physician  in his Wakan Sansai Zue (1712) interpreted the text to read "its knee-cap resembles that of a tiger's forepaw claws". The accompanying woodcut illustration (figure top right) depicts this. The artist Toriyama Sekien who consulted Terajima's encyclopedia also drew the creature with the claws on the knees, with the caption: "..its kneecaps are sharp like tiger claws".

Sources 
The description occurs in a quote from the Xiang miang ji ("Records of Xiang mian", 8th century) preserved in the well-known Ming Period materia medica, the Bencao Gangmu.

A similar description can be found  the Shui Jing Zhu (Commentary on the Water Classic, 6th century) as quoted in the 17th century Ming Period dictionary, where it is stated that the shuihu is also known as shuitang or shuilu; however, the form shuitang may only be uniquely attested in the Tongya.

Geography 

Pharmacological use 

The original text found in the Bencao Gangmu states that the if the suihu is caught alive, then the harvested nose can be "used for some trifles". The part of the anatomy in question is not referred to as the nose (bi) but as the biyan in the Tongya text, further explained to be the yin or the "force" (si) of the beast. In reference to the shuihu, the harvest of this body part has been glossed as "castration", namely, the removal of its genitals, as one newspaper has more bluntly put it. It is also stated that the part can be applied as an aphrodisiac (meiyao).

trifle use
The term xiaoshi  which has been literally rendered as "used for some trifles" in translation actually refers to some aspect of sexuality or reproduction (bodily fluid), according to sources. More specifically, this term xiaoshi  (lit. "small use") is glossed as a synonym of xiatong  (lit. "small avenue/path") in the Zhengzitong dictionary, etc., and one instance of usage of "small avenue" occurs in a poem in the Han shi waizhuan, where it is sung that the male's "small avenue" achieves sexual maturity at age 16, and the female's at age 14. In an English translation of this poem, the male's "small avenue" is rendered as "semen", and the female's as "her fluids".

taming
There are alternative interpretations, where instead of pharmacological use, the live specimen becomes a tamed or trained  beast with the removal or manipulation of the body part.

One interpretation of the statement is that when the genitals are removed the beast, it becomes tame or docile, much like the spaying or neutering of dogs and cats.

Classification issues 

In Japan, the word suiko (shuihu) has become a synonym for kappa, but this was not always the case.

 in his 18th century Wakan Sansai Zue stated that the suiko was a type/kindred of a kawatarō (the western local name for kappa) but was to be distinguished from it; thus he placed the suiko and kawatarō as separate (though adjacent) entries. The artist Sekien, who followed after this encyclopedia, also illustrated the two creatures separately.

However, many herbal medicinalist scholars, etc., during Japan's Edo Period equated the suiko with the kappa. Hence suiko became a synonym or alias for kappa or kawatarō. But it is not clear if the shuihu of China and the kappa of Japan share a common origin. The synonymous usage can be found in Ono Ranzan's commentary, which was on the topic of the suiko (shuihu), but also discussed the creature's love of sumo-wrestling usually associated with the Japanese kappa; he also included various collected lore on the suiko (i.e., kappa) found from his fieldwork or information gathering conducted in Japan. An illustrated work entitled  was in fact a catalogue of kappa legends and testimonies.

In parts of Aomori Prefecture, the kappa have been deified and enshrined by the name of suiko-sama.

See also 
 kappa

Explanatory notes

References 
Citations

Bibliography

External links 
 
 

Chinese legendary creatures

Kappa (folklore)